Thalles Lima de Conceição Penha (18 May 1995 – 22 June 2019), known simply as Thalles, was a Brazilian football player who played as an attacker mostly for Vasco da Gama.

Thalles died on 22 June 2019 in a motorcycle crash in São Gonçalo.

Honours

Club
Vasco da Gama
Campeonato Carioca: 2015
Campeonato Carioca: 2016

International
Brazil U20
Toulon Tournament: 2014

References

External links

1995 births
2019 deaths
Brazilian footballers
Afro-Brazilian sportspeople
People from São Gonçalo, Rio de Janeiro
Association football forwards
Campeonato Brasileiro Série A players
Campeonato Brasileiro Série B players
CR Vasco da Gama players
Associação Atlética Ponte Preta players
Brazil youth international footballers
Brazil under-20 international footballers
2015 South American Youth Football Championship players
J2 League players
Albirex Niigata players
Brazilian expatriate footballers
Expatriate footballers in Japan
Brazilian expatriate sportspeople in Japan
Road incident deaths in Brazil
Motorcycle road incident deaths
Sportspeople from Rio de Janeiro (state)